The Best of Clannad: In a Lifetime is a greatest hits compilation album by Irish folk group Clannad. It contains two new tracks, "Christmas Angels" and "What Will I Do", the latter of which is on the soundtrack to the Kevin Costner film Message in a Bottle.

Charts

Track listing 
 "In a Lifetime" (duet with Bono) 3:08
 "Theme from Harry's Game" 2:30
 "I Will Find You" 5:15
 "What Will I Do" 5:30
 "Almost Seems (Too Late to Turn)" 4:45
 "Both Sides Now" (duet with Paul Young) 4:42
 "Robin (The Hooded Man)" 2:51
 "Newgrange" 4:04 
 "Of This Land" 4:44
 "Something to Believe In" (duet with Bruce Hornsby)4:48
 "Caisleán Óir" 2:08
 "Trail of Tears" 5:15
 "Rí na Cruinne" 4:00
 "Buachaill Ón Éirne" 3:13
 "Sirius" 5:35
 "A Dream in the Night" 3:08
 "Fadó" (with Ian Melrose - guitar) 5:18
 "Christmas Angels" 4:16

"Clannad Chilled", Limited Edition Bonus Disc 
 "Saltwater" - Chicane feat. Moya Brennan (Mothership Mix)
 "Úirchill An Chreagáin"
 "Croí Cróga"
 "Na Laethe Bhí"
 "Dobhar"
 "Coinleach Glas An Fhómhair (Cantoma Mix)"
 "Together We (Cantoma Mix)"
 "Caisleán Óir (Planet Heaven Mix)"

2003 greatest hits albums
Clannad compilation albums